Anoplonida inermis is a species of squat lobster in the family Munididae. The species name is derived from the Latin inermis, meaning unarmed, in reference to the lack of spines on the upper side of the carapace.

References

Squat lobsters
Crustaceans described in 1994